The Fest for Beatles Fans (previously known as Beatlefest) is a twice-annual, three-day festival that honors the lasting legacy of the Beatles. The festival takes place in the New York metropolitan area, ordinarily in March or April, and in Chicago, Illinois, each August. Running Friday through Sunday, the Fest features special guests, live concerts, exhibits, art contests, a Beatles marketplace, a sound-alike contest, a Battle of the Beatles Bands, and more.

History 

The Fest for Beatles Fans began in 1974 after founder Mark Lapidos ran the idea by John Lennon during an encounter at the Pierre Hotel in New York City. Lapidos asked Lennon for permission, to which Lennon replied, "I’m all for it! I’m a Beatles fan too!"

The first Fest, titled Beatlefest '74, took place over the weekend of 14–15 September 1974 at the Commodore Hotel in New York City. Over 8,000 Beatles fans attended. The event was supported by BBC TV and Apple Corps in London; both organisations supplied archive films and promotional clips, some of which had never been seen in the US. Each Beatle donated an item to be auctioned off for charity – guitars from Lennon and Paul McCartney, a table from George Harrison, and autographed drumsticks from Ringo Starr. Lennon considered attending, but decided not to because he was nervous about the crowd. May Pang, his girlfriend at the time, went in his place, with instructions to buy any interesting-looking memorabilia. Melody Maker journalist Chris Charlesworth helped Pang select items. Beatlefest '74 was recognized on the cover of Rolling Stone magazine.

Since its inception in 1974, the Fest has taken place every year in the New York Metropolitan area. It has taken place in Chicago, Illinois, every year since 1977. The Fest has also taken place in Atlanta, Boston, Houston, Las Vegas, Los Angeles, Orlando, Philadelphia and San Francisco.

Lapidos' 1977 application for a registered trademark on Beatlesfest was granted by the United States Patent and Trademark Office in 1979 but challenged by Apple Corps in 1997 and ceded by Lapidos in 2002, since when the name The Fest for Beatles Fans has been used.

Events and activities 

Among the events and activities at the Fest for Beatles Fans are nightly concerts by Beatles tribute band Liverpool, appearances and performances by various musical guests, photo exhibits, a Beatles museum and art contest, a Beatles sound-alike contest, the Battle of the Beatles Bands, panels and discussions with authors and Beatles experts, movie screenings, live auctions, puppet shows, and a Beatles marketplace. In 2014, the Fest included a bus trip to JFK Airport to commemorate the 50th anniversary of the Beatles' arrival in America.

Past attendees 

Since its inception in 1974, the Fest has hosted hundreds of special guests, including:

Musicians

 Randy Bachman, Canadian musician and founder of The Guess Who and Bachman–Turner Overdrive Bachman was also a part of Ringo Starr's 1992 All-Starr Band.
 Pete Best, drummer for the Beatles before being replaced by Ringo Starr
 Blac Rabbit, American psychedelic rock band who gained popularity covering Beatles music
 Glen Burtnik, performed with Beatlemania, Styx and the Orchestra; performs in Fest house band Liverpool
 Howie Casey, saxophonist for Tony Sheridan's Beat Brothers, Liverpool band Howie Casey & the Seniors, and Wings
 Chad & Jeremy, 1960s English folk rock duo
 Jon Cobert, Grammy Award-nominated pianist who performed with John Lennon
 Spencer Davis, leader and guitarist for the Spencer Davis Group
 Micky Dolenz, drummer and lead singer for the Monkees
 Donovan, Rock and Roll Hall of Famer
 Richie Havens, singer, guitarist, songwriter
 Greg Hawkes, keyboardist for the Cars, played keyboards for McCartney 
 Steve Holley, Laurence Juber, Denny Laine, Henry McCullough, and Denny Seiwell – former members of Paul McCartney & Wings
 Jim Horn, saxophonist/flutist on solo recordings by all four Beatles
 Brett Hudson, vocalist, guitarist and bassist for the Hudson Brothers
 Mark Hudson, member of the Hudson Brothers, Ringo Starr's producer for ten years
 Neil Innes, musician for Bonzo Dog Doo-Dah Band, Monty Python and The Rutles, performed at the Concert for George
 Billy J. Kramer, 1960s pop singer who recorded several Lennon–McCartney songs
 Jackie Lomax, vocalist/guitarist for the Undertakers, original artist for Apple Records
 Gerry Marsden, leader of the British Merseybeat band, Gerry and the Pacemakers
 Mike McCartney, vocalist/writer for The Scaffold as Mike McGear, Paul McCartney's younger brother
 Delbert McClinton, singer/songwriter, taught John Lennon how to play blues harmonica
 Robbie McIntosh, guitarist for the Pretenders and the Paul McCartney backing band
 Joey Molland, Mike Gibbins, guitarist and drummer for Apple Records band Badfinger
 Chris Montez, singer/musician, toured with the Beatles
 Harry Nilsson, singer-songwriter who was close with John Lennon and Ringo Starr.  In 1982, Nilsson released an exclusive limited-edition single called "With a Bullet" at Beatlefest to raise money for gun control.
 Peter Noone, lead singer of Herman's Hermits
 Roy Orbison Jr., American musician and record producer
 David Peel, singer and Apple Records recording artist
 Mike Pender, founding member and lead vocalist for the Searchers
 Peter and Gordon (Peter Asher and Gordon Waller), who performed at Fest conventions together and separately
 Billy Preston, keyboardist who appeared on several Beatles tracks in the late 1960s
 The Quarrymen, a British skiffle/rock and roll group formed by Lennon which eventually evolved into the Beatles
 Mark Rivera, saxophonist who played with Lennon and toured with Ringo Starr and His All-Starr Band
 Tom Scott, saxophonist on solo recordings by Harrison, Starr and McCartney
 Tony Sheridan, singer-songwriter and guitarist who was an early collaborator with the Beatles
 Earl Slick, guitarist for New York Dolls, Phantom, Rocker & Slick, Silver Condor; sideman for the John Lennon and David Bowie "Fame" sessions 
 The Smithereens, American rock band influenced by the Beatles who released two albums of Beatles covers
 Ronnie Spector, singer and former member of the Ronettes
 Hamish Stuart, guitarist for Average White Band and the Paul McCartney backing band
 Terry Sylvester, English guitarist/singer with The Escorts, The Swinging Blue Jeans and The Hollies
 Doris Troy, singer and Apple Records recording artist
 Lon & Derrek Van Eaton, singers/guitarists and brothers, Apple Records recording artists
 Klaus Voormann, met the Beatles in Hamburg in the early 1960s, designed the cover of Revolver, and played bass with Lennon as part of the Plastic Ono Band
 Alan White, drummer for John Lennon, George Harrison and Yes
 Andy White, drummer on "Love Me Do"
 Gary Wright, recorded with George Harrison and Ringo Starr, toured with the All-Starr Band
 Roy Young, piano player, Tony Sheridan's Beat Brothers, Cliff Bennett & The Rebel Rousers, Roy Young Band

Other guests

 Nancy Lee Andrews, former international model turned photographer, formerly engaged to Ringo Starr
 Tony Barrow, Beatles press officer who coined the phrase "The Fab Four"
 Sid Bernstein, booked The Beatles at Carnegie Hall and Shea Stadium
 Pattie Boyd, the former wife of George Harrison and Eric Clapton
 Al Brodax, producer of The Beatles TV series and the Yellow Submarine film
 Chris Carter, Los Angeles-based disc jockey who hosts Breakfast with the Beatles
 Alan Clayson, pop music historian who wrote a book on each Beatle
 Ray Coleman, biographer of Lennon and McCartney
 Ken Dashow, disc jockey at New York City's WAXQ "Q104.3" classic rock radio, Fest MC
 Jack Douglas, Grammy Award-winning record producer for Double Fantasy
 Geoff Emerick, engineer for the Beatles 1966–69, producer for Paul McCartney
 Bob Eubanks, before gaining fame as the host of The Newlywed Game, was a DJ who produced The Beatles performances at the Hollywood Bowl
 Prudence Farrow, author and film producer, subject of the Beatles song "Dear Prudence"
 Robert Freeman, photographer for four Beatles album covers
 Bob Gruen, photo–journalist and author
 Terri Hemmert, Chicago DJ at WXRT-FM, Fest MC in Chicago since 1978
 Larry Kane, Philadelphia television news anchor, the only American journalist to accompany the Beatles on their 1964–1965 American tours
 Astrid Kirchherr, met the Beatles in Hamburg in the early 1960s, took early photographs of the group, and dated former bassist Stuart Sutcliffe
 Cynthia Lennon, John Lennon's first wife
 Martin Lewis, Beatles historian, Fest MC for over 20 years
 Mark Lewisohn, Beatles historian and author
 Ken Mansfield, former manager of Apple Records
 Bruce Morrow, American radio personality known to many listeners as Cousin Brucie
 Jack Oliver, former President of Apple Records (1969-1971)
 May Pang attended the first Beatlefest where she purchased a photograph that became the cover of Lennon's Rock 'n' Roll album
 Alan Parsons, engineer for the Beatles 1969–70, musician, leader of the Alan Parsons Project
 Paul Saltzman, film and TV producer/director, joined the Beatles in India
 Ken Scott, Beatles engineer 1967-69
 Norman Smith, Beatles engineer 1962–65, record producer, singer, premiered his memoir at the March 2007 convention
 Victor Spinetti, Welsh actor who appeared in the Beatles films A Hard Day's Night, Help! and Magical Mystery Tour
 Bruce Spizer, Beatles historian and author
 Alistair Taylor, personal assistant of Beatles' manager Brian Epstein, General Manager of Apple Corps
 Vivek Tiwary, author of the graphic novel The Fifth Beatle about Epstein
 Kenneth Womack, Beatles historian and biographer of record producer George Martin

References

External links 

 

The Beatles
1974 establishments in New York City
Music festivals in New York (state)
Music festivals in Chicago
April events
August events
Annual events in New York (state)
Fan conventions
Annual events in Illinois